Portrait Werner Herzog is an autobiographical short film by Werner Herzog made in 1986. Herzog tells stories about his life and career.

The film contains excerpts and commentary on several Herzog films, including Signs of Life, Heart of Glass, Fata Morgana, Aguirre, the Wrath of God, The Great Ecstasy of Woodcarver Steiner, Fitzcarraldo, La Soufrière, and the Les Blank documentary Burden of Dreams.''

The film is notable for footage of a conversation between Herzog and Lotte Eisner, a film historian whom Herzog admired. In another section, he talks with mountaineer Reinhold Messner, in which they discuss a potential film project in the Himalayas to star Klaus Kinski.

References

External links 
 

1986 films
1980s short documentary films
West German films
1980s German-language films
German short documentary films
Autobiographical documentary films
Films directed by Werner Herzog
1980s German films